Mashi (also Romanized as Māshī) is a village in Sarduiyeh Rural District, Sarduiyeh District, Jiroft County, Kerman Province, Iran. At the 2006 census, its population was 28, in 5 families.

References 

Populated places in Jiroft County